Rafetus is a genus of highly endangered softshell turtles in the family Trionychidae. It is a genus of large turtles which are found in freshwater habitats in Asia.

Species
According to most taxonomists, the genus Rafetus contains the following two species.
Rafetus euphraticus  – Euphrates softshell turtle
Rafetus swinhoei  – Yangtze giant softshell turtle

A third species, Rafetus leloii  (synonym R. vietnamensis ), known commonly as the Hoan Kiem turtle, has been proposed as a species. It is considered a junior synonym of Rafetus swinhoei by most authorities, but some Vietnamese scientists insist the two forms are not identical.  The last known individual at Hoan Kiem Lake was found dead on 19 January 2016.

Taxonomy

Cladogram
As drawn by Walter G. Joyce, Ariel Revan, Tyler R. Lyson, and Igor G. Danilov (2009)

Distribution
 Rafetus euphraticus: had been found at Tigris and Euphrates Rivers in Iraq, Syria, Turkey, and Khūzestān Province of Iran. The International Union for Conservation of Nature rates it as Endangered.
 Rafetus swinhoei: Only three known living individuals, one in Suzhou Zoo (China) and two in two lakes in northern Vietnam, Dong Mo lake and Xuan Khanh lake. IUCN rates it as critically endangered.

References

External links

Gray JE (1864). "Revision of the Species of Trionychidae found in Asia and Africa, with Descriptions of some New Species". Proc. Zool. Soc. London 1864: 76–98. (Rafetus, new genus, p. 81).

 
Turtle genera
Taxa named by John Edward Gray
Taxonomy articles created by Polbot